Edson Michael Buddle (born May 21, 1981) is an American retired soccer player who is currently the head coach of USL League Two side Westchester Flames. He is one of only 11 players to have scored 100 goals in Major League Soccer history.

Buddle began his career in North America in 2000 with the Long Island Rough Riders, who played in the A-League at that time. He then spent 2001 to 2010 in Major League Soccer, playing for the Columbus Crew, New York Red Bulls, Toronto FC, and LA Galaxy. After a one-year stint with FC Ingolstadt 04 in Germany's 2. Bundesliga he returned to Los Angeles. Buddle has also played for the United States national team, including two appearances at the 2010 FIFA World Cup.

Club career

College and Minor-League Career
Born in New Rochelle, New York, Buddle played one year of college soccer at State Fair Community College, leading them to the 1999 NJCAA Division I National Championship. Buddle began his professional career in 2000, when he signed with Long Island Rough Riders of the A-League. Buddle helped the team win the Northeast Division, scoring eleven goals and four assists, and was a finalist for the A-League Rookie of the Year Award.

Columbus Crew
His performance in the A-League attracted the interest of MLS, and Edson was selected twenty-seventh overall in the 2001 MLS SuperDraft by Columbus Crew. Buddle played only 556 minutes in his first year, but scored three goals and two assists. The next year, at the age of twenty-one, he scored nine goals and five assists in only 1304 minutes while helping the Crew to a U.S. Open Cup win. Plagued by injuries, he only started sixteen games the next year, but scored nine goals and four assists. The pattern repeated itself in 2004, as Buddle missed significant time to injury, but still scored eleven goals and two assists in twenty starts. His 2005 totals were nine goals and two assists.

New York Red Bulls
Before the 2006 season Buddle was traded to New York Red Bulls for Eddie Gaven and Chris Leitch. He had a disappointing year in his tenure with the team only scoring six goals because he was battling a foot injury. On November 22, 2006, Buddle was traded to Toronto FC for Tim Regan. He failed to score in 10 appearances for the Reds but assisted on the club's first ever goal, setting up Danny Dichio to score against Chicago Fire in front of the south stand at BMO Field.

Los Angeles Galaxy
On June 13, 2007, Buddle was traded to LA Galaxy for Tyrone Marshall. He scored his first goal for the Galaxy against Real Salt Lake.

Buddle was not expected to be a starting striker as the 2008 MLS season began, as the Galaxy already had three attacking forwards in Carlos Ruiz, Landon Donovan and Alan Gordon. In spite of this, Buddle became a prominent striker on the LA offense in 2008, filling in for the injured Guatemalan striker Ruiz or when Donovan and Ruiz were absent while on international duty.

He scored two hat tricks during his first season in Los Angeles: one in Week 8 against FC Dallas and one in Week 12 against San Jose Earthquakes, winning the MLS Player of the Week in both weeks. After his second hat trick, teammate David Beckham commented, "Edson is an individual who is getting better at the game. He's proved that tonight." After scoring his ninth goal against Columbus Crew on June 22, 2008, coach Ruud Gullit said he had become a "true professional" and that he was "very pleased" with him. ESPN's Andrea Canales noted that Buddle had once suffered from a reputation of being "maddeningly lazy at times, giving up on passes that didn't fall in his striking-sweet zone," but that he had improved due to guidance from Beckham and an improved self-confidence as he scored more goals. MLS Extratime's Shep Messing said, "I don't think there's a better tandem up top than Landon Donovan and Edson Buddle...They complement each other. They don't take away each other's space, making it better for each other."

After scoring just five goals in the 2009 season, Buddle opened the 2010 season on fire, scoring seven goals in the first four matches of the year. By mid-May, he had scored nine times, earning a surprising call-up to the national team roster for the 2010 FIFA World Cup. He continued his strong form after returning from the World Cup, continuing to lead the league in scoring when the 2010 MLS All-Star Game rosters were announced despite having missed several matches on international duty. On October 24, 2010, Los Angeles Galaxy won the Western Conference and the Supporter's Shield, with Buddle winning the Galaxy's MVP, golden boot, and Humanitarian of the Year.

FC Ingolstadt 04
Buddle signed with 2. Bundesliga club FC Ingolstadt 04 on January 10, 2011. He debuted for Ingolstadt on January 21 in a 1–1 draw against MSV Duisburg. He scored his first goal for the Bavarian side in the 78th minute of that game. Buddle was released by FC Ingolstadt 04 on January 31, 2012, making him a free agent.

Return to Los Angeles Galaxy and Colorado Rapids
Despite trialing with Everton the day after being released by Ingolstadt, Buddle re-signed with Los Angeles Galaxy. His second stint with the club proved disappointing and short-lived. Buddle started only 10 league games in 2012 and scored only 3 goals, his lowest season tally in MLS since his rookie year of 2001.

On December 14, 2012, Colorado Rapids acquired Buddle from Los Angeles in exchange for allocation money and a first-round pick in the 2013 MLS Supplemental Draft. On August 21, 2014, Buddle became only the eighth player to score 100 goals in MLS by heading in Dillon Powers' corner kick, albeit in a 3–4 home defeat to the Galaxy.

Buddle was released by Colorado on November 25, 2014. He returned to a third spell at the Galaxy on March 6, 2015. Buddle became a free agent on December 7, 2015, when the Galaxy declined his option.

International career
Although he may have been a promising player for the United States national team, Buddle's injuries have made it difficult for him to break into the squad. He figured for the under-20 and under-23 teams, playing in the 2001 World Youth Championship with the former. Buddle earned his first senior team cap on March 29, 2003, in a friendly against Venezuela but would not see the field for the United States again for seven years. On May 11, 2010, he was named to the preliminary squad for the 2010 FIFA World Cup, and on May 25, started in a 4–2 friendly loss to the Czech Republic. The following day, Buddle was named to the final squad. Buddle contributed two first-half goals in a friendly match versus Australia on June 5. In the 2010 FIFA World Cup he appeared as a substitute in matches against England and Algeria.

International goals

Career statistics

Club

International

Personal
Buddle is named after Edson Arantes do Nascimento, better known as Pelé.  His father, Winston Buddle, a former professional soccer player born in Jamaica, chose the name.  Buddle attended Port Chester High School in Westchester County, New York.

Honors
Columbus Crew
 Supporters' Shield: 2004
 Lamar Hunt U.S. Open Cup: 2002

LA Galaxy
 MLS Cup: 2012
 Supporters' Shield: 2010
 Western Conference
 Regular Season: 2009, 2010
 Playoffs: 2012

Individual
 Los Angeles Galaxy MVP: 2010
 Los Angeles Galaxy Golden Boot: 2010
 Los Angeles Galaxy Humanitarian of the Year: 2010
 MLS Player of the Month: August 2002, April 2010
 MLS Best XI: 2010

References

External links
 
 
 

1981 births
Living people
African-American soccer players
American people of Jamaican descent
People from Port Chester, New York
Soccer players from New York (state)
Sportspeople from New Rochelle, New York
Association football forwards
Long Island Rough Riders players
A-League (1995–2004) players
Columbus Crew players
Doping cases in association football
New York Red Bulls players
Toronto FC players
American expatriate sportspeople in Canada
LA Galaxy players
FC Ingolstadt 04 players
Colorado Rapids players
LA Galaxy II players
Major League Soccer players
2. Bundesliga players
USL Championship players
Expatriate soccer players in Canada
Expatriate footballers in Germany
United States men's international soccer players
2010 FIFA World Cup players
Major League Soccer All-Stars
United States men's under-20 international soccer players
United States men's under-23 international soccer players
Columbus Crew draft picks
American soccer players